Loorana is a rural locality in the local government area (LGA) of King Island in the North-west and west LGA region of Tasmania. The 2016 census recorded a population of 120 for the state suburb of Loorana.

History 
Loorana was gazetted as a locality in 1971. The name is believed to be an Aboriginal word for “brushwood”. The area was previously known as Porky.

Geography
The waters of the Southern Ocean form the western boundary.

Road infrastructure 
Route B25 (North Road) runs through from south to north.

References

Towns in Tasmania
King Island (Tasmania)